A listing of the characters from the ALF television series that ran between 1986 and 1990 as well as it's spin-offs.

ALF

Tanner family

Willie Tanner
William Francis "Willie" Tanner (played by Max Wright.) is the father figure, and a Social worker by trade. Willie is an amateur radio enthusiast, and it was a result of his shortwave radio signals that ALF followed them and crashed into his home. Willie also avidly collects scale model train sets. He attended Claremont High School, then later graduated from UCLA. When Willie uses his ham Radio to call somebody, he uses the callsign "K726XAA".

He was arrested by the Secret Service after ALF made telephone calls to the President in an attempt to convince the President to deactivate the nuclear weapons program and disassemble America's Nuclear Stockpile, which were misconstrued as the alien trying to threaten the president as he didn't explain properly what he was talking about, acting like it was a threat instead of a request. Like his wife, he was a flower child during the 1960s.

Shortly into the second season, Willie was seen without his regular glasses (but wearing reading glasses) then later in season 2, he was back to wearing his regular glasses.

Willie and ALF have a good, if often strained, relationship. They tend to bicker and snipe at one another, sometimes causing Willie to lose his temper, but each will also do their best to come to the others aid in times of strife, though Willie tends to be more strict than ALF would like. Next to Brian, Willie seems to have the strongest bond with ALF out of the cast and the two share as many scenes together, if not more, than do ALF and Brian, Willie's first son. Many of the arguments that the characters often engage in revolve around the cross cultural difference between Earth and Melmac, or sometimes simply come about because of some bizarre behavior ALF is engaging in.

Despite their strained relationship, Willie has referred to ALF as being "amazing" and often marvels at some of the things Alf has revealed about the universe beyond the Earth's solar system. ALF holds Willie in high regard for letting him stay with the Tanners and protecting him from the Alien Task Force and despite their arguments, Alf is usually the first to try to help Willie when things go wrong.

Kate Tanner
Katherine Daphne "Kate" Halligan Tanner (played by Anne Schedeen.) is the mother figure. In addition to her mother who plays a role in the series, she has at least one sister. She majored in art history and sometimes works in real estate. Like her husband, she was a flower child during the 1960s. In the episode "Jump," it was mentioned that she once had a poem published in a magazine which was her goal, which shows her interest in poetry. Kate has an uneven relationship with ALF. Although she finds him a nuisance most of the time, Kate cares for ALF's well-being.

She gives birth to Eric William Tanner in the season three episode "Having my Baby." During that time, Anne Schedeen was really pregnant during the series. However, she was pregnant with a girl in reality which made the twin boys only her TV son.

Lynn Tanner
Lynn "Lynnie" Tanner (played by Andrea Elson) is the eldest child of the Tanner family and their only daughter. She was a shy girl whom ALF attempted to make more extroverted. One of ALF's ways to get Lynn to raise her confidence was entering her in a beauty contest. Kate actually confided to Willie once that she was concerned her daughter was spending too much time with ALF, sardonically suggesting that if they weren't careful they might end up with half-alien grandchildren. She often defends ALF's behaviour to her parents.

Over the course of the series, she dates several men including a boy nicknamed "Lizard", a performer named Robert, a boy (unseen) named "Lloyd" (but he pronounced both L's), and an athlete named Danny Duckworth.

Brian Tanner
Brian "Bri" Tanner (played by Benji Gregory) is the elder son and middle child of the Tanner family. He seems to bond with ALF the most. It is fairly common to see the two paired in scenes together during the series, and Brian is often involved in some of Alf's pranks and schemes. Nicknamed 'B' by the rest of the cast, Brian formed a friendship with the Ochmonech's nephew Jake, who also discovered the existence of Alf, and the three characters were often seen together during the third season of the show. Brian usually acts as the straight man to Alf's jokes and gags out of the duo, but Brian has gotten in a few jokes at Alf's expense during the series as well. They often appear to have a relationship resembling that of siblings despite the gap in their relative ages and cultural differences (Brian was in elementary school during the series' run, while Alf was well over two hundred by the time he arrived on earth.). Brian is also the one who is quickest to worry for Alf's safety if it seems something has happened to him, and Alf seems to have the most regard for Brian's feelings throughout the series than any other member of the cast. Alf will go to great lengths for Brian both to cheer him up if he's upset, or to help out when he needs it though his plans tend to go awry, though Brian usually forgives him for any problems he's caused because he knows the alien is simply trying to help.

Eric William Tanner
Eric William Tanner is the younger son of the Tanner family. He debuted in the episode "Having My Baby" from season 3.

Lucky the Cat
Lucky is the Tanner family's cat. Since cats are a common dinner on Melmac, ALF occasionally tries to eat him, though he refrains from doing so because the Tanners trust him. The character died in the fourth season, replaced by a kitten adopted by ALF himself.

Lucky II
Lucky II is the Tanner family's new cat. ALF originally wanted to eat him, but after seeing a kitten for the first time ALF fell in love with Lucky II. ALF adopted Lucky II after Lucky died in Season 4.

Relatives of The Tanner family

Dorothy Halligan Deaver
Dorothy Halligan Deaver (played by Anne Meara) is the widowed mother of Kate, the mother-in-law of Willie, and the grandmother of Lynn, Brian, and Eric. She first appeared halfway through the first season as an unwelcome houseguest, passive-aggressively criticizing everything Kate did by re-doing it. Incensed at her mistreatment of Kate, ALF revealed himself to her, and used her frightened state to make her listen. By the next episode she still hadn't gone home, and ALF once again schemes to get to the truth, discovering that her roommate threw her out. Ever since, Dorothy has had a love-hate relationship with ALF, often threatening to hand him over to the military if he does not behave. This in turn has ALF calls her the Wicked Witch of the West. She is afraid to remarry, until ALF in his own way convinces her it would be a good idea not to die lonely (initially by staging a fake séance to "speak" with her late husband - a stunt which inevitably backfires). She eventually marries a jazz musician nicknamed "Whizzer".

Neal Tanner
Neal Tanner (played by Jim J. Bullock) is Willie's younger brother and the uncle of Brian, Lynn, and Eric. Neal lived with the Tanner family briefly after his wife Margaret left him before moving into his own apartment and gaining employment in the same apartment building as a handyman. Neal met Margaret in the Future Farmers group at Claremont High School. ALF originally did not like Neal as he was forced to hide, but eventually got to form some friendship after Willie revealed ALF's existence to Neal.

"Whizzer" Deaver
"Whizzer" Deaver (played by Paul Dooley) is Dorothy's second husband, Kate's stepfather, Willie's stepfather-in-law, and Lynn, Brian, and Eric's step-grandfather. Whizzer is a talented jazz musician. He accidentally meets ALF in Season 4. He ran into the kitchen where ALF usually hides when there is company. Before the Tanners were able to hide him, Whizzer fainted when he first saw him. Whizzer and ALF both eventually came to hate each other.

Recurring characters

The Ochmonek family
The Ochmonek family are the neighbors of the Tanner family.

 Trevor Ochmonek (played by John LaMotta) - He is a Master of Arts graduate, who played football for 7 years through high school and he is a veteran of the Korean War, where he served as a pilot. He is a heavy cigar smoker and often unintentionally rude.
 Raquel Ochmonek (played by Liz Sheridan) - The wife of Trevor. She is very nosy, often spying on the neighbors with a looking glass and spreading rumors. One time, Raquel spots ALF and reports him to the Alien Task Force. When Jake came to live with her, she considers him a replacement for the children she never had. Raquel was also a cheerleader in high school and, according to her husband, still has the same figure.
 Jason "Jake" Ochmonek (played by Josh Blake) is the nephew of Trevor and Raquel who was sent to live with Raquel and Trevor after his father was in jail. His mother struggles with kleptomania and is unable to care for Jake. A mechanical genius, he has an unrequited crush on Lynn, although he also falls for a schoolmate named Laura (Carla Gugino). His girlfriend appeared in one episode in Season 3. He was one of ALF's best friends; they met while Jake was trying to steal the Tanner's telescope and ALF caught him. When Jake breaks it, he promises to fix it and forms a bonding friendship with ALF. Jake would also befriend Brian Tanner, and the three often shared scenes during the third season. Jake was shown to be skilled with cars in the episode "Fight Back", and when ALF posited the idea that Willie was being scammed, he readily jumped at the opportunity to help ALF in his plan to expose the crooked mechanic behind it. He was also willing to aid ALF in his attempt at helping Brian overcoming his fear of being out at night in the outdoors in the episode "Don't Be Afraid of the Dark", also from the third season. ALF and Jake banter in some episodes much like ALF and Willie do, but it is less a case of occasionally antagonizing one another and more a friendly banter where the two are generally just having fun since the two have similar personalities, as compared to the much stricter Willie and ALF, whose personalities are often at cross-purposes due to ALF's alien nature and mannerisms.

Jody
Jody (played by Andrea Covell) is a blind woman who ALF befriends in "For Your Eyes Only". Jody is unaware that ALF is an alien and rather thinks he is just a weird person. After she moves out of her apartment, ALF invites her to stay with the Tanners until she finds a new one. When she does find a new apartment, ALF moves in with her uninvited until Kate and Willie manage to make him move out again. She appeared once more in Season 3 when ALF celebrated a reunion, featuring everyone who's ever met him (Dorothy, Larry, Jake, Neil, etc.) at a party where the other people attending tried to hide the info about what ALF really is.

Lawrence "Larry" Dykstra
Lawrence "Larry" Dykstra (played by Bill Daily) is a shrink who appears in several episodes when ALF and Willie Tanner have problems. In Season 2, Larry helps the Tanners when ALF is addicted to a ventriloquist dummy who starts controlling ALF. Larry helps the Tanners again for ALF's reunion of his friends. Larry appeared again in Season 3 when ALF seemed too bored to do anything, but by listening to Larry diagnose a problem of Willie's at the dinner table, ALF began trying to practice psychology, to everyone's frustration.

Melmacians
While most Melmacians appear in ALF: The Animated Series, Rhonda, Skip, Rick, and Stella have appeared in the live-action series.

The Shumway family
 Bob Shumway (voiced by Thick Wilson) - Gordon's father.
 Flo Shumway (voiced by Peggy Mahon) - Gordon's mother.
 Curtis Shumway (voiced by Michael Fantini) - Gordon's little brother.
 Augie Shumway (voiced by Paulina Gillis) - Gordon's little sister.
 Harry - The Shumway family's pet bird.
 Neep - The Shumway family's pet vespa (a species like a dog).

Other characters
 Rhonda (performed by Lisa Buckley in the live-action series, voiced by Paulina Gillis in the animated series) - Gordon's girlfriend. She appeared in the episode of the live-action series titled "Help Me, Rhonda." Before the destruction of Melmac, Skip saves Rhonda by taking her away in his spaceship. When performing Rhonda, Lisa Buckley is assisted in performing her by Scott Hopper, Steve Lamar, John Lovelady, Richard J. Schellbach, and Randy Simper.
 Skipper "Skip" III (performed by Bob Fappiano in the live-action series, voiced by Rob Cowan in the animated series) - One of Gordon's friends. He appeared in the episode of the live-action series titled "Help Me, Rhonda." Before the destruction of Melmac, Skip saves Rhonda by taking her away in his spaceship. When performing Skip, Bob Fappiano is assisted in performing her by Scott Hopper, Steve Lamar, John Lovelady, Richard J. Schellbach, and Randy Simper.
 Rick Fusterman (performed and voiced by Paul Fusco in both TV series) - One of Gordon's friends. He appeared in the episode of the live-action series titled "Help Me, Rhonda." Following the destruction of Melmac, Rick married Stella and they opened a tanning parlor on Mercury. When performing Rick, Paul Fusco is assisted in performing her by Scott Hopper, Steve Lamar, John Lovelady, Richard J. Schellbach, and Randy Simper.
 Stella (performed by Lisa Buckley in the live-action series, voiced by Ellen-Ray Hennessy in the animated series) - A restaurant waitress on Melmac. The cartoon series reveals that the restaurant that Stella works at is called "Eddie's". Following the destruction of Melmac, Stella married Rick Fusterman and they opened a tanning parlor on Mercury. When performing Stella, Lisa Buckley is assisted in performing her by Scott Hopper, Steve Lamar, John Lovelady, Richard J. Schellbach, and Randy Simper.

Minor characters

 Luis Mancia (played by Phillip Gordon) - A Mexican boy who was taken in for one night by Willie. Luis meets ALF when he mistakes him to for the neighbors' dog. They have "tilled together" and "mulched together", according to ALF. Luis is the only one not invited back to ALF's reunion featuring the friends who have met him. After the episode featuring Luis, he is never heard from again.
 Fredo Mancia - The father of Luis Mancia. He moves to Riverside when his farm in San Felipe, Mexico goes under and works in a carpet factory on a work permit. His son, Luis, runs away and tries to get Willie (who works at the Social Services Department of Los Angeles County) to get him on a bus back to San Felipe.
 Tiffany (played by Keri Houlihan) - A terminally ill child named Tiffany that ALF met in the one-hour special "ALF's Special Christmas".
 Uncle Albert (played by Elisha Cook, Jr.) - Willie's uncle and Lynn and Brian's great-uncle. He is described as a grumpy, inconsiderate and stingy man, but he changes his ways when he had a heart attack and was hospitalized for over a month. While hospitalized, no one came to visit him or send him a card, which made him realize he brought it on himself due to his past attitude. This inspires Albert to become more considerate towards people and generous with others; giving each member of the Tanner family expensive gifts and paying for dinner. He tragically dies of shock when he discovers ALF staying in a tent in the backyard, arguably triggering a second heart attack. ALF celebrates his death according to Melmacian funeral customs, which sparks a debate between him and Willie over the proper way to show respect for the dead. When ALF realizes that Albert collapsed in shock due to his sight, this causes ALF to believe he is responsible, and isolates himself from everyone like a condemned murderer until Lynn consoles ALF by showing the death was accidental and that Albert was given a chance to mend his past sins, which many do not get to do.
 Angel Bob (played by Joseph Maher) - ALF's guardian angel. ALF is surprised to see Bob when no one else can, and is somewhat puzzled that his guardian angel is not a Melmacian. After convincing Gordon he is an angel, Bob grants ALF's request for a new life. He previews this new life in an "It's a Wonderful Life" manner. In the end, ALF decides that he doesn't want a new life and wants everything to go back to normal.
 Eddie (played by Michael Des Barres) - A graduate student in architecture, taught history for a while, and is a substitute novelist (he signs books for authors when they are too busy) when Lynn meets him.
 Robert Sherwood - A street performer at the beach. He is also a caterer's assistant for Rex Savage.
 Randy (played by Mark Clayman) - A center for the high school football team.
 Cathy Berry - One of Lynn's friends
 Brenda (played by Judy Landers) - The secretary of Wayne Schlegel
 Jim "Jimbo" Hutchinson (played by Todd Susman) - A co-worker of Willie's at the Social Services Department of Los Angeles County
 Nick "The Fish" Mints (played by David Leisure) - A bookie with which Dorothy places bets on "The Gambler".
 Garland - The man at Whizzer's wedding to Dorothy.
 Andrea (played by Rebecca Booneis) - One of the guests that attended Kate's surprise baby shower.
 Elliot - The name of Andrea's baby that she brings to the baby shower which ALF was allergic to.
 Maura Norris (played by Dorothy Lyman), Betty (played by Stephanie Hagen), and Sylvia (played by Hilary Thompson) - They are one of Kate's college roommates.
 Laverne Litwhack (played by Nancy Lenehan) - A lady that lives in the Tanner's neighborhood
 Laura (played by Carla Gugino) - Jake's girlfriend.
 Nick Susla (played by Richard McKenzie) - He is not enthusiastic and would like to enjoy a quiet retirement.
 Betty Susla (played by Kathleen Freeman) - A woman in Barstow who was featured in an article in The National Inquisitor.
 Mrs. Lyman (played by Marcia Wallace) - The principal of the Franklin Elementary School.
 Kelly - An orderly or nurse at the hospital.
 Mr. Foley - The name of a man that allowed Willie's family to stay at his cabin.
 Gravel Gus (played by Tracey Walter) - A hobo on the train.
 Hannah (played by Nicole Dubuc) - A little girl who is the owner of the lost dog Brian found.
 Felicia Burke - The wife of Walter Burke.
 Walter Burke - Willie's boss at the Social Services Department of Los Angeles County.
 Myrna Byrd - A widow that lives in the Tanner's neighborhood.
 Steve Michaels - An administrator for Sendrax.
 Bernice - The name of a woman that attended the Tanner Halloween party dressed as a cowgirl.
 Bert - The tow truck driver who tows the Tanners ' car home when it breaks down.
 Carl Buck - A set decorator for the movie Jupiter Guys.
 Scott Maynard (played by Kurt McKinney) - One of Lynn's boyfriends who is part of a band called the G-Men.
 Lizard (played by Geoffery Blake) - One of Lynn's boyfriends who got his name from removing a lizard's tumor during a biology class.
 Danny Duckworth (played by Ricky Paull Goldin) - One of Lynn's boyfriends who plays on the high school baseball team.
 Consumer Ed - A TV reporter that ALF calls in to investigate the warranty on the Tanner's TV
 Aaron King (played by Pete Willcox) - A reclusive neighbor and truck driver from Tupelo, Mississippi, who ALF is convinced is Elvis Presley in hiding in the Season 3 episode "Suspicious Minds"
 Howie Anderson (played by John Pinette) - A comedian who highlights his own obesity in his stand up routine.
 Marilyn - A journalist for The National Inquisitor.
 Mr. Polniakoff - The owner of a club in Catskills.
 Julius - A mortician with a morbid sense of humor.
 Brandon Tartikoff - A head of programming at NBC.
 Elaine Ochmonek (played by Randee Heller) - Jake's mother and Trevor's sister-in-law who is a kleptomaniac.
 Denise - A pregnant woman who gets stuck in an elevator when going into labor, with only ALF there to help.
 Richard - Denise's husband.
 Rex - A caterer hired by the Tanners to plan their luau.
 Spencer - A boy in Brian's class at school.
 Bill Lowman - A sales manager at Rancho Estates.
 Jack (played by Phil Leeds), Bernie (played by Eric Christmas), Rebecca (played by Amzie Strickland), and Louise Beaumont - One of the four senior citizens. They met ALF by accident when he came to see Louise and befriended him.
 Mr. Fusco - One of the suspects.
 Old Cat Lady at 165 (played by Nedra Volz) - An old lady at 165 (Hemdale presumably).
 The Brothers of the Peaceful Dominion - They are silent monastic order that ALF joins when he discovers that he was born in wedlock.

Appearing from Gilligan's Island
 Gilligan (played by Bob Denver) - He is a crewman of the S. S. Minnow who worked for the Skipper.
 The Skipper (played by Alan Hale, Jr.) - He is the captain of the S. S. Minnow.
 Mary Ann Summers (played by Dawn Wells) - A farm girl from Winfield, Kansas.
 Professor (played by Russell Johnson) - He was a high school teacher before being stranded on the island.

Appearing from The Tonight Show
 Ed McMahon - An American comedian, actor, singer, game show host and announcer.
 Tommy Newsom - A saxophone player.
 Joan Embery - An animal and environmental advocate.
 Joyce Brothers - An American psychologist, television personality and columnist.
 Pope John Paul II (played by Gene Greytak) - He appeared as a guest.
 Matinee Lady (played by Teresa Ganzel) - The lady who gives the testemonail for Pecs 'R Us gym during the Tea Time Movie segment.
 Frederick De Cordova - He appeared on the show and sternly warns ALF.

Villains
 Alien Task Force - Various actors appeared in the ALF TV series as the Alien Task Force in many episodes, such as the ALF pilot (both versions), and the Thanksgiving special.
 Andrew Seminick (played by Larry Hankin) - When Raquel comes over to sit for Brian, he breaks into the house through Kate and Willie's room where ALF is hiding.
 Keith (played by Darwin Joston) - An animal shelter worker that captured ALF.
 Rodney - A Melmacian Cockroach that escaped to planet Earth in ALF's spaceship.
 Lenny Scott (played by Raye Birk) - The host of a local television talk show.
 Mr. Cuckoo - Lenny Scott's sidekick on his television show.
 Ethel Buttonwood (played by Anne Ramsey) - An elderly, acerbic woman that claims that Alfina, a stray dog the Tanners find, is hers. After a jealous Alf gives Alfina to her without the family's permission, Alf rescues her and returns her to her rightful owner.
 Vince (played by Logan Ramsey) - Ethel Buttonwood's extremely jealous and violent ex-boyfriend.
 Mr. Duncan (played by Martin Doyle) - A surly man of short stature and he is a scrap metal dealer.
 Paul - The name that ALF gives to his ventriloquist dummy.
 Pete "Flaky" Finnegan (played by David Ogden Stiers) - A hobo who hung around the Tanner house and spotted ALF during Thanksgiving.
 Larson Petty (voiced by Thick Wilson) - The primary villain of the animated series. He is an unspecified alien who has tried to invade Melmac many times and is constantly thwarted by ALF.
 Eggbert and Sloop (both voiced by Dan Hennessey) - Larson Petty's henchmen.

References

External links

ALF (TV series)
ALF characters
ALF